The Battle of Bovianum was fought in 305 BC between the Romans and the Samnites.

Battle 
The Romans were led by two consuls, Tiberius Minucius Augurinus and Lucius Postumius Megellus. The result was a Roman victory and end of the Second Samnite War.

Aftermath 
The battle of Bovianum at last completely crushed the spirit of the Samnites, who, unable to continue the war, were obliged to accept the terms dictated by Romans. The Romans then proved victorious at the Battle of Bovianum and the tide turned strongly against the Samnites from 314 BC onwards, leading them to sue for peace with progressively less generous terms. By 304 BC the Romans had effectively annexed the greater degree of the Samnite territory, founding several colonies. This pattern of meeting aggression in force and almost inadvertently gaining territory in strategic counter-attacks was to become a common feature of Roman military history.

References

Sources 
 Livy, Ab urbe condita 9, 44, 5-16
 Diodorus Siculus, Bibliotheca historica 20, 90, 3-4

305 BC
Bovianum
Bovianum
Bovianum
4th century BC in the Roman Republic